Creator is a 1985 American comedy film directed by Ivan Passer, starring Peter O'Toole, Vincent Spano, Mariel Hemingway, and Virginia Madsen. It is based on the 1980 novel of the same title by Jeremy Leven, who also wrote the screenplay adaptation.

Plot

Dr. Harry Wolper is an eccentric medical professor teaching at a small Southern California college who is obsessed with making a clone of his wife Lucy who died in childbirth 30 years earlier. Harry hires Boris Lafkin, a struggling pre-med student as his personal assistant to help him with his experiments by obtaining lab equipment and working in his backyard shed in exchange for which Harry gives Boris love life advice in courting an attractive coed named Barbara who slowly becomes smitten with Boris. To continue his research into cloning, Harry meets and employs a young woman, named Meli, who practically moves in with him on an agreement to contribute her ovary sample as part of the cloning progress. Meli slowly falls for the much older Harry who begins to question his ethics and vision of true love. Meanwhile, a rival of Harry's, fellow medical professor Dr. Sid Kuhlenbeck, tries to investigate and hinder Harry's cloning plans as part of a ploy to remove Harry from the university to take over Harry's lab for himself.  Dr. Kuhlenbeck's plan is to have Harry reassigned to Northfield, an outlying branch of the university where no actual research is conducted, and which apparently serves as little more than a place to send older scientists.  Kuhlenbeck's plan backfires after Harry successfully earns a sizable research grant.  Because grants are given to individuals, and not institutions, the grant money follows Harry to Northfield, much to Kuhlenbeck's chagrin.

Barbara suffers an aneurysm and is hospitalised by Sid. Her parents welcome Boris into their hearts, but are advised to turn off her life support despite his protestations. Harry gains some time for Boris to talk to Barbara in her coma, and eventually she wakes up. Harry pours his dead wife’s cells into the sea and marries Meli. Everyone chooses to follow him to Northfield.

Cast

 Peter O'Toole as Dr. Harry Wolper
 Mariel Hemingway as Meli
 Vincent Spano as Boris Lafkin
 Virginia Madsen as Barbara Spencer
 David Ogden Stiers as Dr. Sid Kullenbeck
 John Dehner as Paul
 Karen Kopins as Lucy
 Kenneth Tigar as Pavlo
 Elsa Raven as Mrs. Mallory
 Rance Howard as Mr. Spencer
 Ellen Geer as Mrs. Spencer
 Ian Wolfe as Prof. Brauer
 Byrne Piven as Krauss
 Jordan Charney as Dr. Whitaker
 William H. Bassett as Dr. Sutter
 Jeff Corey as Dean Harrington
 Michael McGrady as Larry
 Eve McVeagh as Woman with monkey (final screen appearance)

References

External links
 
 
 

1985 films
Films based on American novels
1985 comedy films
Films about academia
Films about cloning
Films set in California
American comedy films
Films scored by Sylvester Levay
Films directed by Ivan Passer
1980s English-language films
1980s American films